The Petromin Corporation is a Saudi Arabian lubricants and automotive services company, operating in lubricant oils including manufacturer, industrial, and automotive oils and lubricants, car servicing (Petromin Express), fuel retailing and car dealerships. The company is one of the "Major Leading Players" of the lubricating grease Industry.

History
The company was established by a royal decree on 24 February 1968 The initial name of the company was Petromin Lubricating Oil Company and was renamed to Saudi Arabian Lubricating Oil Company in 1997. It was established as a joint venture between Saudi Aramco and Mobil investments and started production at its first blending plant in Jeddah, in 1970. The first director general of the company was Abdulhadi Taher.

The company was initially destined to replace foreign-owned Aramco as the states primary oil company, but due to company inefficiencies, personal rivalries and corruption, instead it was decided to make it "Saudized" Aramco.

In May 2003, Petromin became one of the first companies to obtain international ISO Certification for their Quality and Integrated Management Systems (ISO 9001:2015). The company has since been re-certified in 2014 and received the OHSAS 18001:2007 certification for their Health and Safety Management Systems at the Jeddah plant in 2017.

It was established to be the statist oil development of Saudi Arabia because at that time Aramco was 100% American owned. Under the responsibility of Dr. Abdulhadi H. Taher, Petromin became an industrial behemoth with tens of thousands of employees. It was responsible for all oil exploration, refining, and distribution of all petroleum and mineral resources in the kingdom that were not in the domain of then US-controlled oil concessionaire Aramco. After the Kingdom purchased Aramco from the americans, Petromin and most of its industrial developments were infused into it.

Joint-venture between Dabbagh Group and Gulf Oil Corporation
Petromin was a joint venture between Mobil Investments (29% stake) and Saudi Aramco (71% stake), an affiliate of ExxonMobil with an annual sale of 80,000 metric tons and an annual turnover of $200 million.
In 2007 it was purchased by Dabbagh Group and Gulf Oil Corporation, a subsidiary of Indian Hinduja Group, for $200 million. Dabbagh took a 51% stake and Hinduja a 49% stake in the new joint venture.

In 2008, the company was renamed to its current name Petromin Corporation.

In 2010 the Hinduja Group announced the launch of the initial public offering of Petromin.

In 2013, The Dabbagh group purchased the Hinduja stake based on a total valuation of more than $700 million, made by Deutsche Bank, who assisted in the deal.

In 2015, Petromin signed a five-year partnership with Hyundai and Al-Majdouie, to serve its oils at all Hyundai centers in the region and to supply diesel engine oils to Al-Majdouie Logistics.

In 2017, the company employed around 5,000 people.
Petromin was one of the first companies in Saudi Arabia to start employing women in 2007.

Petromin currently operates two main plants. The Jeddah Lube oil blending and Grease plant is now one of the biggest oil and mobilization plants in the middle east, and Petromin Corporation is the largest maker of lubricants in Saudi Arabia, with a present production capacity of 150,000 MT annually. It was originally erected in 1968, with a blending capacity of 70,000 MT and upgraded in 2011 to its current capacity. The facilities encompass the Jubail lubricants and grease manufacturing plant which was built in 1985, with a production capacity of 6,000 MT of greases. Petromin also owns the Riyadh Blending Plan, which was commissioned in 1981, and has a production capacity of around 75,000 MT per year. The plant works in cooperation with the drum manufacturing company Greif, Inc., allowing a direct filling of Petromins products.

The company produces industrial and non-industrial oil, lubricants and other associated products. The main product categories are gasoline, diesel engine oils, gear and transmission oil, greases, industrial, marine and specialty products. In these categories the company produces more than 150 different products.

The company currently distributes its products to over 35 countries across the world, with a focus in the GCC, Middle East, Africa and Asia.

Petromin Express is a chain of quick lube service centers throughout Saudi Arabia, offering different parts, products and services to customers. The chain operates more than 700 outlets.

The company also runs a gas station network across the country, which is partly connected to Petromin Express service station, offering combined automotive services. 
Petromin is one of only two companies allowed to set up fuel stations along highways in Saudi Arabia. In 2017 the company first announced its plans to build 240 gas stations across the Kingdom.

Petromin entered a partnership with Nissan, becoming the official authorized distribution agent in Saudi Arabia. The first showroom was opened in Riyadh on 16 October 2016. In 2019, Petromin and Nissan extended the partnership.

Activities
The Jeddah plant of Petromin is one of the biggest oil and mobilization plants in the Middle East and Petromin Corporation is the largest maker of lubricants in Saudi Arabia, with a present production capacity of 300,000 metric tons.

References

External links

1962 establishments in Saudi Arabia
Oil and gas companies of Saudi Arabia
Saudi Arabian brands
Non-renewable resource companies established in 1962